AHEAD ammunition is an acronym for "Advanced Hit Efficiency And Destruction" ammunition. The 35mm variety produced by Oerlikon Contraves splits each projectile into 152 submunitions "that form a cone-shaped pattern to destroy a target's control surfaces and.. other vital components". This type of ammunition is listed as an official acronym at the Ministry of Defense (UK).

Types
There were in 2017 four types of 35 mm AHEAD ammunition:
PMD062 with a payload of 152 sub-projectiles,
PMD330 with 497 sub-projectiles,
PMD375 with 860 sub-projectiles,
PMD428 with more than 600 sub-projectiles

History
AHEAD ammunition was developed as early as 1993.

In 2011 the Taiwanese government procured itself a Skyguard system, which is based on the AHEAD ammunition.

In 2012 AHEAD was delivered to the Luftwaffe by Rheinmetall for their MANTIS defense system.

At the 2018 Euronaval trade show, the Oerlikon Millenium Gun was noted as able to fire AHEAD ammunition.

In 2018, AHEAD ammunition capable Oerlikon Revolver Guns were proposed to the Ministry of Defense (Egypt) by the manufacturer, in order to update its air defense system.

In January 2019 the South African Defence Forces boasted about its upgraded ability to fire AHEAD ammunition at airborne targets via a networked multi-gun emplacement.

In June 2021, Rheinmetall tested its 35mm Revolver Gun against drone swarms with the use of AHEAD ammunition. Firing PMD 428 rounds, an eight-drone swarm was neutralized with an 18-round burst, most of them being destroyed with the first 6 rounds.
 
In summer 2022 AHEAD was the subject of study by a group of Chinese scientists.

In August 2022 the munitions were listed on the scrapped purchase order for the badly-needed towed air defence gun missile systems (ADGMS) of the Ministry of Defence (India) (MODIN). It seemed the matter excited quite some controversy around this time.

In October 2022 the munitions were listed as one of the technical requirements for a gun that would be procured by the MODIN.

In November 2022 the Chairman of the Verkhovna Rada, Ruslan Stefanchuk, pleaded to the Biden administration for the donation of C-RAM air defense systems which use AHEAD ammunition.

References

Ammunition
Projectiles